Mr. Robinson (also known as Robinson Jr.) is a  1976 Italian comedy film directed by Sergio Corbucci. It is a parody of the Daniel Defoe's 1719 novel Robinson Crusoe.

Plot 
The Milanese fashion guru Roberto Minghelli embarks with his wife on a cruise. One morning he wakes up in a now-sunken ship but is able to escape to an island, where he finds an abandoned hut which had a famous owner, Robinson Crusoe. Although the city slicker seems to be completely unsuitable for survival on a deserted island, Roberto adapts over time to his location and even leads a relatively happy life. But then he discovers that he is not alone on the island: a pretty young native, whom he calls Friday, joins him, and things start to be more complicated.

Cast 

 Paolo Villaggio as Roberto Minghelli / Robinio / Robinson 
 Zeudi Araya as  Friday
 Anna Nogara as  Magda
  Percy Hogan as  Mandingo

Release

See also    
 List of Italian films of 1976

References

External links

  

1976 films
1976 comedy films
Italian comedy films
1970s Italian-language films
Films based on Robinson Crusoe
Films directed by Sergio Corbucci
Films set on uninhabited islands
Films scored by Guido & Maurizio De Angelis
1970s Italian films